Mycerinus is a genus of longhorn beetles of the subfamily Lamiinae.

 Mycerinus brevis Aurivillius, 1914
 Mycerinus dorcadioides (Audinet-Serville, 1835)
 Mycerinus limbatus Kolbe, 1894
 Mycerinus multilineatus Breuning, 1936
 Mycerinus punctiventris (Kolbe, 1893)
 Mycerinus subcostatus (Kolbe, 1894)

References

Crossotini